District Jail Lahore is an ancient Jail situated on Ferozepur Road in Lahore, Pakistan. Previously, it had been an open jail and referred to as Camp Jail.

See also
 Government of Punjab, Pakistan
 Punjab Prisons (Pakistan)
 Prison Officer
 Headquarter Jail
 National Academy for Prisons Administration
 Punjab Prisons Staff Training Institute

References

External links
 Official Website of Punjab Prisons (Pakistan)

Prisons in Pakistan
Lahore